Padesur is a village in Dharwad district of Karnataka, India.

Demographics 
As of the 2011 Census of India there were 433 households in Padesur, and a total population of 2,228, consisting of 1,161 males and 1,067 females. There were 237 children ages 0-6.

References

Villages in Dharwad district